Seləkəran (also, Selakeran and Selyakeran) is a village and municipality in the Astara Rayon of Azerbaijan.  It has a population of 886.

References 

Populated places in Astara District